Benátky nad Jizerou is a town in Mladá Boleslav District in the Central Bohemian Region of the Czech Republic. It has about 7,400 inhabitants. The historic town centre is well preserved and is protected by law as an urban monument zone.

Administrative parts
The town is made up of town parts of Benátky nad Jizerou I–III and villages of Dražice and Kbel.

Geography

It lies on the Jizera River in the Jizera Table plateau.

History
The first written mention of the village of Obodř (today part of Benátky nad Jizerou III) is from 1052. In 1264, the Dražice Castle was founded. In 1346 Lord Jan of Dražice obtained permission to establish a town on a nearby hill. The town was named Nové Benátky (lit. "New Venice"). In 1349 the monastery and the Church of the Nativity of the Virgin Mary were built.

Demographics

Economy
The town part of Dražice is known for the manufacturer of water heaters DZ Dražice. It is the biggest company of its focus in the country, known throughout Europe. The company was founded in 1900, originally as grain warehouse, craft roller mill and bakery, later also a hydroelectric power plant. The water heaters are produced since 1956.

Sights

The town is the site of a castle and observatory built by astronomer Tycho Brahe. Johann von Klenau, the Habsburg general, was born at the castle in 1758. His old Bohemian family owned the castle at the time. Later it was owned by the counts of Thun und Hohenstein.

Notable people
Johann von Werth (1591–1652), German general; lived and died here
Franz Benda (1709–1786), violinist and composer
Johann Georg Benda (1713–1752), violinist and composer
Georg Benda (1722–1795), violinist and composer
Joseph Benda (1724–1804), violinist and composer
Johann von Klenau (1758–1819), field marshal

Twin towns – sister cities

Benátky nad Jizerou is twinned with:
 Hustopeče, Czech Republic
 Modra, Slovakia

 Reinsdorf, Germany
 Roßdorf, Germany

References

External links

Town castle 
Benátky nad Jizerou - virtual show

 
Cities and towns in the Czech Republic
Populated places in Mladá Boleslav District